Sakić is a Serbo-Croatian surname. Notable people with the surname include:

Sinan Sakić (born 1956), Serbian folk singer
Nenad Sakić (born 1971), former Serbian footballer

See also
Šakić

Serbian surnames
Croatian surnames